Huang Yuxiang (born 25 January 1993) is a Chinese badminton player. He won his first international senior title at the 2016 New Zealand Open.

Achievements

Asian Junior Championships 
Boys' singles

BWF Grand Prix (1 title, 3 runners-up)
The BWF Grand Prix had two levels, the Grand Prix and Grand Prix Gold. It was a series of badminton tournaments sanctioned by the Badminton World Federation (BWF) and played between 2007 and 2017.

Men's singles

  BWF Grand Prix Gold tournament
  BWF Grand Prix tournament

References

External links 
 
 
 

1993 births
Living people
Sportspeople from Hangzhou
Badminton players from Zhejiang
Chinese male badminton players
Badminton players at the 2010 Summer Youth Olympics
21st-century Chinese people